Unión Deportiva Fuerteventura was a Spanish football team based in Fuerteventura, in the autonomous community of the Canary Islands. Founded in 2004, it played its last season (2009–10) in Tercera División, and held home games at Estadio Los Pozos, with a capacity of 2,000 spectators.

History
Club Deportivo Corralejo was founded in 1975. In 2004, as the Canary Islands team was playing in Segunda División B, it merged with Club Deportivo Fuerteventura (born in 1987) to create Unión Deportiva Fuerteventura.

The new club started also in level three, after taking Corralejo's berth, but was relegated immediately. In 2007–08, again in the third category, Fuerteventura achieved its best-ever position as third, but lost in the promotion playoffs to Alicante CF (0–3 on aggregate).

In the following season, although the club finished above the relegation zone, it was nonetheless relegated for failing to pay its players, and folded soon after.

For 2010–11, Fuerteventura tried to compete in the first regional division, taking the reserve team's license, but the club was finally dissolved due to the lack of funds.

Season to season

3 seasons in Segunda División B
3 seasons in Tercera División

Famous players
 Alberto Monteagudo
 Pedro Luis
 Fali Benítez
 Jonathan Sesma
 Ibrahim Cruz
 Antonio Valdivia
 Lorenzo Zúñiga
 Kike Gandul
 Michael Pearcey
 Yaki Yen

References

External links
Official website 
Unofficial website 

Association football clubs established in 2004
Association football clubs disestablished in 2010
Defunct football clubs in the Canary Islands
2004 establishments in Spain
2010 disestablishments in Spain